The 2017 Aegon Classic Birmingham was a women's tennis tournament played on outdoor grass courts. It was the 36th edition of the event, and a Premier tournament on the 2017 WTA Tour. It took place at the Edgbaston Priory Club in Birmingham, United Kingdom, on 19–25 June 2017.

Points and prize money

Point distribution

Prize money

Singles main draw entrants

Seeds 

1 Rankings as of June 12, 2017.

Other entrants 
The following players received wildcards into the main draw:
  Naomi Broady
  Petra Kvitová
  Heather Watson

The following players received entry from the qualifying draw:
  Camila Giorgi
  Hsieh Su-wei
  Elizaveta Kulichkova
  Markéta Vondroušová

The following player received entry as a lucky loser:
  Tereza Smitková

Withdrawals 
Before the tournament
  Simona Halep →replaced by  Natalia Vikhlyantseva
  Daria Kasatkina →replaced by  Christina McHale
  Angelique Kerber →replaced by  Tereza Smitková
  Madison Keys →replaced by  Alizé Cornet
  Mirjana Lučić-Baroni →replaced by  Donna Vekić
  Jeļena Ostapenko →replaced by  Magda Linette
  Karolína Plíšková →replaced by  Naomi Osaka
  Monica Puig →replaced by  Duan Yingying
  Agnieszka Radwańska →replaced by  Nao Hibino
  Elena Vesnina →replaced by  Ashleigh Barty

Retirements 
  Camila Giorgi (right thigh injury)
  Lucie Šafářová (right thigh injury)
  Coco Vandeweghe (left foot injury)

Doubles main draw entrants

Seeds 

1 Rankings as of June 12, 2017.

Other entrants 
The following pair received a wildcard into the doubles main draw:
  Naomi Broady /  Heather Watson

Withdrawals 
During the tournament
  Lucie Šafářová (right thigh injury)
  Abigail Spears (left leg injury)
  Coco Vandeweghe (left foot injury)

Champions

Singles

  Petra Kvitová def.  Ashleigh Barty, 4–6, 6–3, 6–2

Doubles

  Ashleigh Barty /  Casey Dellacqua def.  Chan Hao-ching /  Zhang Shuai, 6–1, 2–6, [10–8]

Notes

References 

http://www.lta.org.uk/major-events/aegon-classic-birmingham/aegon-classic-news/

External links 
 

2017 WTA Tour
2017
2017 in English tennis